The Grand Prix Alanya is a cycling race held in Turkey. It is part of UCI Europe Tour in category 1.2.

Winners – Men's race

Winners – Women's race

References

 
Cycle races in Turkey
2018 establishments in Turkey
Recurring sporting events established in 2018
UCI Europe Tour races